Mukhabarat el-Jamahiriya  (Intelligence of the Jamahiriya) was the national intelligence service of Libya under Muammar Gaddafi. During the Libyan Civil War, agency director Abuzed Omar Dorda was captured by anti-Gaddafi forces, the agency ceased to exist when the Jamahiriya was toppled in August 2011.

In 1988, the agency was accused of causing the bombing of Pan Am Flight 103 over Lockerbie, Scotland, killing 270 people.

Successor 
The Intelligence Community under Interim Government:
 External Security Service
 Internal Security Service
 General Directorate of Military Intelligence

References

External links
Libyan Intelligence from GlobalSecurity.org

First Libyan Civil War
Government of Libya
Libyan intelligence agencies
History of Libya under Muammar Gaddafi